This page lists the results of leadership elections held by the Progressive Conservative Party of New Brunswick or as it was known before March 3, 1943, the Conservative Party.  Before 1925 leaders were chosen by the caucus.

1925 leadership convention

(Held June 29, 1925)

John Babington Macaulay Baxter acclaimed

Developments 1925-1937
Baxter resigned as premier on appointment to the bench in 1931 and was succeeded as premier by Charles Richards on May 18 of that year. Richards was in turn appointed to the bench in 1933 and was succeeded as premier by Leonard Tilley on June 2 of that year. Following Tilley's personal defeat in the 1935 general election which also saw the Conservatives swept from power he resigned and Frederick C. Squires was chosen House leader on September 10.

1937 leadership convention

(Held on October 27, 1937)

Frederick C. Squires acclaimed

Squires resigned after the 1939 general election and Hugh H. Mackay was chosen House leader on January 20, 1940.

1942 leadership convention

(Held on September 23, 1942)

Hugh H. Mackay acclaimed

1951 leadership convention

(Held on July 11, 1951)

Hugh John Flemming acclaimed

Following his government's defeat in the 1960 general election  Flemming was appointed to the federal cabinet and resigned as party leader. Cyril Sherwood was chosen House leader on November 5, 1960.

1962 leadership convention

(Held on October 27, 1962)

Cyril Sherwood acclaimed

1966 leadership convention

(Held on November 26, 1966)

Charles Van Horne 458
Richard Hatfield 135
Roger Pichette 9

Van Horne was defeated in the 1967 election and resigned on February 8, 1968. Richard Hatfield was chosen House leader.

1969 leadership convention

(Held on June 14, 1969)

Richard Hatfield 799
Charles Van Horne 554
Mathilda Blanchard 13

Joe McDougall and William T. Walker withdrew before balloting.

1989 leadership convention

(Held November 4, 1989)

Barbara Baird Filliter 1,021
Hazen Myers 348

1991 leadership convention

(Held June 15, 1991)

Dennis Cochrane 955
Bev Lawrence 116

1995 leadership convention

(Held May 13, 1995)

Bernard Valcourt 944
Scott MacGregor 416
John Hazen 47

1997 leadership convention

(Held October 18, 1997)

First Ballot:
Bernard Lord 1,390
Norm Betts 1,223
Cleveland Allaby 663
Margaret-Ann Blaney 527

Second Ballot (Blaney eliminated, Allaby withdrew):
Bernard Lord 1,830
Norm Betts 1,413

2008 leadership convention

(Held on October 18, 2008)

David Alward 2,269
Robert MacLeod 1,760

2016 leadership convention

(Held on October 22, 2016)

First Ballot:
Blaine Higgs 1,228
Mel Norton 1,078
Monica Barley 948
Mike Allen 892
Jake Stewart 700
Brian McDonald 605
Jean F. Dubé 39
(Stewart, McDonald and Dubé eliminated)

Second Ballot:
Blaine Higgs 1,417
Mel Norton 993
Monica Barley 861
Mike Allen 829
(Barley and Allen eliminated)

Third Ballot:

Blaine Higgs 1563
Mel Norton 1,169

See also
leadership convention
Progressive Conservative Party of New Brunswick

References

Carty, Kenneth R., et al., Leaders and Parties in Canadian Politics: Experiences of the Provinces. Harcourt Brace Jovanovich Canada, 1992.
Stewart,Ian and Stewart, David K., Conventional choices: Maritime leadership politics. University of British Columbia Press, 2007.
Canadian Annual Review 1925-26.
Canadian Annual Review 1930-31.

 
Conservatism-related lists